Melanie "Mel" Clewlow (born 7 May 1976 in Dover, Kent) is an English field hockey player.

She was a member of the England and Great Britain squads. She made her international debut in 1996, and was part of the England squad that won silver in the 1998 Commonwealth Games, as well as competing twice for Great Britain at the 2000 and 2008 Summer Olympics. Clewlow initially retired in 2005, but returned shortly after, and retired a second time after competing at the 2008 Summer Olympics.

She has played for Canterbury Hockey Club.

References

External links
 

1976 births
English female field hockey players
Living people
Olympic field hockey players of Great Britain
British female field hockey players
Field hockey players at the 1998 Commonwealth Games
Field hockey players at the 2000 Summer Olympics
Field hockey players at the 2006 Commonwealth Games
Field hockey players at the 2008 Summer Olympics
Sportspeople from Dover, Kent
Commonwealth Games silver medallists for England
Commonwealth Games medallists in field hockey
People educated at Sir Roger Manwood's School
Medallists at the 1998 Commonwealth Games
Medallists at the 2006 Commonwealth Games